Dead Aim is a crime/suspense novella written by American author Joe R. Lansdale. It is the eleventh book in the Hap and Leonard series featuring Lansdale's longtime protagonists Hap Collins and Leonard Pine.

Plot summary
Hap and Leonard are hired, through Marvin Hanson's private detective agency, to protect a woman from her estranged, abusive husband. Hap is framed for the man's murder while staking out his house, and upon further investigation the two sleuths discover that the victim owed the Dixie Mafia crime syndicate a large sum of money, and in addition he had a large life insurance policy with his wife named as the sole beneficiary. Hap and Leonard are soon involved, not just in the murder, but in a kidnapping and ransom demand as well.

Editions
This book is published by Subterranean Press and issued as a signed and numbered (400 copies) limited edition and as a trade hardcover. The trade edition has sold out.

References

External links
Author's Official Website
Publisher's Website
Artist's Website

Novels by Joe R. Lansdale
American crime novels
2013 American novels
Novels set in Texas
American novellas
Works by Joe R. Lansdale
Subterranean Press books